Moyamba is a constituency of the Parliament of Sierra Leone. It is located in Moyamba District.

As of 2008, it is represented in parliament by J. Jonathan Ambo.

External links
 Members of Parliament

Constituencies of the Parliament of Sierra Leone
Southern Province, Sierra Leone